Kim Jin-sung (born 9 December 1999) is a South Korean footballer who plays for Cheonan City, on loan from FC Seoul, as a midfielder.

Career 
Kim Jin-sung joined FC Seoul in 2020. He made his K League 1 debut on 3 April 2021 against Gangwon FC.

On 13 July 2022, he was loaned to Cheonan City FC of K3 League.

References

External links
 

1999 births
Living people
People from Gimpo
Sportspeople from Gyeonggi Province
South Korean footballers
Association football midfielders
K League 1 players
K3 League players
FC Seoul players
Cheonan City FC players